Walter Edward Bonhote Henderson (21 June 1880 – 2 September 1944) was a British track and field athlete who competed in the 1908 Summer Olympics and in the 1912 Summer Olympics. He was born in Leeds and died in Chelsea, London.

In 1908 he finished eighth in the standing high jump competition. He also participated in the standing long jump event, in the discus throw competition, in the Greek discus throw event, and in the freestyle javelin throw competition but in all these competitions his final ranking is unknown.

Four years later he finished 32nd in the discus throw competition.

References

External links
Walter Henderson, Track Stats, May 2009
profile

1880 births
1944 deaths
Sportspeople from Leeds
English male long jumpers
English male high jumpers
English male javelin throwers
English male discus throwers
Olympic athletes of Great Britain
Athletes (track and field) at the 1908 Summer Olympics
Athletes (track and field) at the 1912 Summer Olympics